Siem Reap is a province (khaet) of Cambodia. It borders the provinces of Oddar Meanchey to the north, Preah Vihear and Kampong Thom to the east, Battambang to the south, and Banteay Meanchey to the west. Its capital and largest city is Siem Reap.

Siem Reap province is the tenth largest province in Cambodia. Having reached a population of one million in 2019, it ranks as the nation's fourth most populous province. A large portion of Siem Reap province's southern border is demarcated by the Tonle Sap and as such, it is one of the nine provinces that making up the Tonle Sap Biosphere Reserve. In modern times the province is best known as the site of Angkor and the Angkor Wat temple ruins, a UNESCO World Heritage Site. It is also the home of Banteay Srei, Roluos (temples), the UNESCO tentative site of Beng Mealea, and the UNESCO tentative site of Phnom Kulen National Park, home to the country's largest reclining Buddha.

Etymology
The name Siem Reap literally means 'Siam defeated', a reminder of the centuries-old conflict between the Siamese and the Khmer. In Siam, the province and its capital were called Siemmarat, literally meaning 'Siam's territory'.

History
The province came under the control of the Thai kingdom of Siam in 1795 and was later returned to Cambodia in 1907 after French made a treaty with Siam for exchange of Trat and Dan Sai for the Siamese province of Inner Cambodia which included Phra Tabong (Battambang), Siemmarat (Siem Reap), and Nakhon Wat (Angkor Wat). The Inner Cambodia province was split into Battambang and Siem Reap by the royal decree of King Sisowath the same year. This area became part of a disputed territory between France and Siam (now Thailand) which led to the Franco-Thai War in 1941, resulting in victory for Thailand and a return to Thai control (with exception of Siem Reap and Angkor Wat). The province again reverted to Cambodia in 1946, after the end of World War II with French and UN international pressure.

Religion

The state religion is Theravada Buddhism. More than 99.3% of the people in Siem Reap province are Buddhists. About 0.4% population of Siem Reap province follow Christianity. Islam which is mostly followed by Chams is 0.2% in the province.

Subdivisions 
The province is divided into 1 municipality and 11 districts, and further subdivided into 100 communes and 907 villages.

Gallery

References

External links

Official website 
Siem Reap - The Gate to Angkor (Official Website of the Provincial Town Siem Reap on www.rithyrineangkorresidence.com

 
Provinces of Cambodia
States and territories established in 1907